Thomas Balfour of Elwick FRSE (2 April 1810 – 30 March 1838) ) was a Scottish politician who sat in the House of Commons from 1835 to 1837. His brother was David Balfour (1811-1887) of Balfour FRSE.

Family

Balfour was the son of Captain William Balfour RN of Trenabie, Orkney.  He became an advocate in 1831 and was elected fellow of the Royal Society of Edinburgh on 16 March 1834. His proposer was Thomas Stewart Traill.

Balfour was elected Member of Parliament for Orkney and Shetland on 9 February 1835.  He held the seat until 1837. He was a Conservative.

In 1837 he is living at 9 Doune Terrace on the Moray Estate.

Balfour died unmarried at the age of 28.  He is buried in the south-west corner of St Johns Churchyard in Edinburgh.

Trivia

His grandfather Col Thomas Balfour of Elwick was portrayed by Sir Henry Raeburn.

References

A 24-page booklet - "Thomas Balfour M.P. for Orkney and Shetland, 1835-1837" -  was published in 1978 by Kirkwall Grammar School.

External links
 

1810 births
1838 deaths
Members of the Parliament of the United Kingdom for Orkney and Shetland
UK MPs 1835–1837
People from Orkney
Fellows of the Royal Society of Edinburgh
Burials at St John's, Edinburgh
Scottish Tory MPs (pre-1912)